Santa Maria Assunta is a Roman Catholic collegiate church located in the Piazza Alta of the town of Sarnano, province of Macerata, region of Marche, Italy.

History

The brick church was erected in the 13th century; the bell-tower, rising near the apse, dates from the 14th century. The façade has two mullioned windows and a sculpted stone portal, with a bas-relief in the lunette depicting the Assumption of the Madonna.

The interior houses painting depicting a Madonna and Child with Saints by Antonio and Giangentile di Lorenzo, a 15th-century Madonna and Child with Angels by Lorenzo D’Alessandro (father of Antonio and Giangentile), and a Holy Trinity (1530) painted by Paolo Bontulli from Percanestro di Serravalle. It also houses a wooden processional standard depicting the Annunciation and Crucifixion by Giovanni Angelo d'Antonio and a Madonna della Misericordia (1494) by Pietro Alemanno, as well as panels from a polyptych depicting Saints by Niccolò Alunno and 15th-century wooden statues for a presepio or nativity scene by unknown Tyrolese artisans. The crypt also has frescoed dated 1494 by Pietro Alemanno.

References

Romanesque architecture in le Marche
Gothic architecture in le Marche
13th-century Roman Catholic church buildings in Italy
Sarnano
Roman Catholic churches in the Marche